The Dão line was a metre gauge railway line in Portugal. It ran close to the Dão River (Rio Dão), between Santa Comba Dão and Viseu. It is now a greenway for cyclists and pedestrians under the name Ecopista do Dão.

The line opened in 1890; it was closed to freight in 1972 and to passengers on 25 September 1988. The tracks have since been lifted and largely replaced by a rail trail.

See also 
 List of railway lines in Portugal
 List of Portuguese locomotives and railcars
 History of rail transport in Portugal

References 

Metre gauge railways in Portugal
Railway lines opened in 1890
Railway lines closed in 1988